Neocollyris sausai is a species of ground beetle in the genus Neocollyris in the subfamily Carabinae. It was described by Naviaux in 2004.

References

Sausai, Neocollyris
Beetles described in 2004